Amadinone (INN), also known as 19-norchlormadinone, is a steroidal progestin of the 19-norprogesterone and 17α-hydroxyprogesterone groups that was synthesized and characterized in 1968 but was never marketed. It has antigonadotropic properties, and for this reason, is a functional antiandrogen. An acetate ester, amadinone acetate, also exists, but similarly was never marketed.

See also 
 Chlormadinone
 Chlormadinone acetate

References 

Norpregnanes
Organochlorides
Progestogens
Abandoned drugs